Sonny Lubick Field at Hughes Stadium was an outdoor college football stadium in the western United States, located in Fort Collins, Colorado. It was the home field of the Colorado State Rams of the Mountain West Conference from 1968 through 2016; the team moved in 2017 to the new on-campus Colorado State Stadium (now Canvas Stadium).

It was natural grass for the stadium's first 38 years; FieldTurf was installed in the summer of 2006 for the final eleven seasons.

History
The stadium opened in 1968 as the replacement for the old Colorado Field, a 14,000-seat on-campus stadium that is now the site of the "Jack Christiansen Track."

Hughes Stadium sat in a natural oval bowl, with seating on three sides and an open grass berm (not open for seating) behind the south end zone. The west (home side) stands were expanded out of the bowl and capped by a press box. Named for Harry W. Hughes, the head coach for 31 seasons (1911–41) at what was then known as Colorado Agricultural, the stadium had a seating capacity of 32,500 with club seats and 12 luxury suites, completed in 2005.

The playing surface itself was named in 2003 in honor of then head coach Sonny Lubick.  The winningest coach in school history, he led the Rams for fifteen seasons (1993–2007), winning six conference titles with nine bowl game appearances.

The inaugural game at Hughes Stadium was played on September 28, 1968, a 17–12 loss to North Texas State, led by defensive tackle Mean Joe Greene, a consensus All-American. From October 1989 to August 1991, the Rams won eight consecutive games at the stadium, a school record. After 49 seasons, its finale in 2016 saw the Rams defeat New Mexico 49–31 on November 19.

Bob Dylan recorded the NBC television special and live concert album Hard Rain at Hughes Stadium during a rainstorm

Demolition
At the time of its closure, future plans for Hughes Stadium were unknown, but it was unlikely to be left dormant or given away, rather more likely to be developed for high-density residential use. CSU eventually decided to demolish the stadium and restore the site to its original bowl-shaped topography before selling the site for future development.

Pre-demolition work began in March 2018 with hazardous material mitigation (mainly asbestos), with full-scale demolition beginning on April 10. Demolition continued into summer, followed by filling in the stadium bowl with soil that had been originally used to create berms around the stadium; the project was completed in late 2018.

Attendance 
Attendance information for primary tenant, Colorado State Rams.

References

External links
 CSU Rams.com - Hughes Stadium
 Hughes Stadium page @ ballparks.com
 World Stadiums.com - photos - Hughes Stadium

Defunct college football venues
Colorado State Rams football
Buildings and structures in Larimer County, Colorado
Tourist attractions in Larimer County, Colorado
American football venues in Colorado
1968 establishments in Colorado
Sports venues completed in 1968
2016 disestablishments in Colorado
Sports venues demolished in 2018